The Parramatta Eels are an Australian professional rugby league football club based in the Sydney suburb of Parramatta that competes in the National Rugby League.

The Parramatta District Rugby League Football Club was formed in 1947, and their home ground was Parramatta Stadium (formerly Cumberland Oval). As of 2019, Parramatta's home ground stadium has been rebuilt and they now play as the co-tenants at Western Sydney Stadium, which sits on the same site that was once Parramatta Stadium.

It took thirty years for the club to make the grand final, which they did in 1976 and 1977, losing on both occasions. However, this period foreshadowed their most successful period in the early 1980s, when they won four premierships and qualified for five grand finals in six seasons. This was a golden era for the club and yielded their only premiership titles. In 2016, a salary cap breach saw them stripped of their 2016 Auckland Nines premiership. The club plays in the National Rugby League, the premier rugby league football competition in Australia. Parramatta sides are also fielded in lower grades and junior competitions run by the New South Wales Rugby League.

History
The playing of rugby union and rugby league in Parramatta lie in the 19th century with the formation of the Parramatta Rugby Club in 1879. With the advent of a Sydney District competition in 1900, the Parramatta club merged with Western Suburbs and played some of its matches at Cumberland Oval. On a local level, rugby league began to be played in 1910 when a district competition was formed.  Other clubs in the Parramatta district also emerged; over the ensuing decades, clubs established in suburbs throughout the area.

Pressure in the area for a local club to participate in the New South Wales Rugby League premiership began in the mid-1930s with a formal proposal put to the NSWRL in 1936 by local rugby league identities such as Jack Argent and Jack Scullin. The proposal was rejected by all clubs except Western Suburbs who, despite having the most to lose from the entrance of a Parramatta side (with much of their territory being lost to Parramatta), voted for the entrance of the new club. The advent of World War II put the establishment of the club on hold and a Parramatta district club was not proposed again until 1946 when the club was successfully admitted into the Premiership.

Foundation and early years

Parramatta saw very little success in their early years, despite narrowly missing out on finals qualification in 1949 under the guidance of former Western Suburbs and Leeds five-eighth Vic Hey. Between 1952 and 1961, they finished last eight times and won only 35 of 180 matches.  The reasons behind the club doing so poorly in the early years was due to a lack of resources and a weak playing roster.  Where other teams fielded test and representative players, Parramatta fielded mainly amateur players or park footballers.  The only players of note during this dark period were Billy Rayner and Brian Hambly.

In 1962, Parramatta made the finals for the first time; this achievement was repeated for the three following seasons under coach Ken Kearney.  Around this time the club managed to finally attract better players such as Ken Thornett, Dick Thornett and Bob O'Reilly. However, the club slid back down the ladder in the following years, collecting the wooden spoon in 1970 and 1972. The club's first major success came in 1975 when they defeated Manly-Warringah in the pre-season cup final.

1970s
In 1976, the club finally reached the Grand Final, in their thirtieth season. However, they lost narrowly to a Manly-Warringah side that they had defeated just two weeks earlier. Both clubs had been admitted into the NSWRFL in 1947, and Parramatta were in their first Grand Final while Manly were in their eighth premiership decider (having qualified for their first in 1951) and were bidding for their third premiership after wins in 1972 and 1973. Unfortunately for Parramatta, this game is regarded as "the one that got away" with Manly winning 13-10 despite the Eels crossing for two tries to Manly's one. A dropped pass by winger Neville Glover with the line wide open in the dying moments of the game ultimately costing the Eels a chance to win the game. Had Glover scored the score would have been tied at 13-all giving goal kicking  John Peard a sideline conversion attempt to win the game.

The following year, Parramatta captured their first minor premiership before qualifying for the Grand Final for the second year running. Against St. George, the match was drawn 9-9, forcing a Grand Final replay the following weekend. In this match, Parramatta lost 22–0. The Eels made the finals in both 1978 and 1979, but missed the finals in 1980 for the first time since 1974.

1980s

The early 1980s was the most successful period for Parramatta, who earned five Grand Final appearances and four premierships from 1981 to 1986. Under the influence of coach Jack Gibson and with a team including names such as Ray Price, Peter Sterling, Eric Grothe, Sr., Steve Ella, Mick Cronin, and Brett Kenny the club captured three consecutive premierships from 1981 to 1983, beating the Newtown Jets in 1981 and the Manly-Warringah Sea Eagles in 1982 and 1983, the most recent "threepeat" in the competition's history. In 1984 the team once again reached the Grand Final, but lost in a low-scoring Grand Final to the Canterbury-Bankstown Bulldogs 6–4. In 1986, the club took out their third minor premiership while also reaching the Grand Final, beating Canterbury 4–2 in the lowest-scoring Grand Final in history. This win proved to be most notably the one of the proudest victories in the clubs history, ending Canterbury's two year Grand Final winning streak. The fourth premiership victory capped off a strong period for the club, between 1975 and 1986, the club had only missed the finals once and played in seven grand finals, winning four.

1990s
From 1987 to 1996, the Parramatta club failed to make the finals. With the advent of the Super League war in the mid-1990s, Parramatta capitalised on staying with the Australian Rugby League by picking up high-profile players such as Dean Pay, Jason Smith, Jim Dymock and Jarrod McCracken from the 1995 premiership-winning side, the Sydney Bulldogs.

In 1997, the Eels remained in the ARL's competition and made the finals for the first time in 11 seasons by finishing third in the Australian Rugby League competition. Parramatta continued into the NRL era which began in 1998, surviving the reduction in teams at the end of the twentieth century. In the 1998 NRL season Parramatta finished 4th and defeated North Sydney in the first week of the finals 25–12. The following week Parramatta traveled to Brisbane in the major semi final and won the match 15-10 earning the week off.

In the 1998 preliminary final Parramatta were leading arch rivals Canterbury 18–2 with less than 10 minutes to play and then what can only be described as the greatest choke in Rugby League preliminary finals history occurred. Canterbury managed to fight their way back into the match and with a minute left on the scoreboard, winger Daryl Halligan kicked a conversion from out on the far touchline to send the game into extra time. Canterbury won in extra time 32–20. The loss was hard to take for Parramatta as they had beaten eventual premiers Brisbane twice during the season.

In 1999, Parramatta led Melbourne 16–0 at halftime in the preliminary final only to lose 18–16 at full time. Melbourne went on to win the premiership the following week. In the 2000 NRL season, Parramatta finished 7th and won both their sudden death finals matches to take on Brisbane in the preliminary final. In a game that they were not expected to win, Parramatta came close but lost the match against a much stronger Brisbane side. This was their 3rd preliminary final loss in a row.

2000s

The Eels reached the 2001 NRL Grand final after a dominant regular season, where they scored a total of 839 points and lost only 4 matches, but were defeated by the Newcastle Knights 30–24. The week leading up to the grand final itself is also remembered for The infamous 2001 grand final breakfast where coach Brian Smith and the Parramatta players attended wearing as Newcastle player Mark Hughes described "Miami Vice black suits". Another Newcastle player Ben Kennedy reflected on the game saying "They came into the game under a sh*tload of pressure but for us, it was just a good time and a heap of fun. Parra were sh*tting themselves and we were just having a good time". Andrew Johns also reportedly could tell how nervous the Parramatta players were and knew they had a chance at making an upset.

In 2005, Parramatta finished as minor premiers in the regular season and came up against North Queensland in the preliminary final. In a game that Parramatta were expected to win, North Queensland defied the odds and won the match 29–0. In 2006, Parramatta finished 8th in the regular season and faced Melbourne in the first week of the finals losing 12-6 and thus being eliminated from the competition.  In 2007, Parramatta again made the preliminary final and once more the opponent was Melbourne.  Parramatta went on to lose the match 26–10. This was their 5th preliminary final loss in nine years.

In 2009, under new coach Daniel Anderson, the Eels had an indifferent start to the season which saw the release of star halfback Brett Finch. After 18 rounds and incredibly inconsistent form, the Parramatta Eels had won only 5 games and were sitting third-last and were in direct contention for the dreaded 2009 NRL Wooden Spoon. TAB SportsBet had the Eels as $151 outsiders to win the NRL Premiership.

Though beginning in Round 19, upset victories against the Melbourne Storm and the Canterbury-Bankstown Bulldogs set the platform for an unexpected 10 wins from the next 11 games, which propelled the Eels into the Top 8 and consequently, premiership contention. This unanticipated winning streak was directly attributed by many sporting experts including Rugby League legend Andrew Johns to the spectacular run of form of star fullback Jarryd Hayne. Winning the award for man-of-the-match in every game from Round 19–24, and again in the first week of the finals, Hayne was described as "the best player in any code of football in Australia" by premiership-winning coach Phil Gould. Following his astonishing string of 7-man-of-the-match performances, Hayne won the award for Dally M Fullback of the Year and was crowned the best and fairest player in the game, winning the Dally M Medal for 2009.

After a 7-game winning streak, the Eels succumbed to a heavy defeat by the minor premiers St George-Illawarra Dragons, however they returned to Kogarah in Week 1 of the 2009 NRL Finals Series and defeated the Dragons 25-12 featuring an impressive late game try by Dally M medal winner Jarryd Hayne. Following successive wins against the Gold Coast Titans (a team that Parramatta had never beaten before), 27–2 at SFS and Canterbury-Bankstown, 22–12 in front of a record-breaking non-Grand Final crowd of 74,549 at ANZ stadium, the Eels qualified for their first Grand Final since 2001, becoming the first 8th-placed team to ever qualify for a Grand Final. On 4 October 2009, Parramatta Eels played the deciding game of NRL, against the Melbourne Storm at ANZ Stadium in front of a crowd of 82,538. The Melbourne Storm defeated the Eels 23–16, ending what critics called "the Parramatta Fairytale" and winning the NRL Premiership. Such was the euphoria at the time with Parramatta making an incredible run to the 2009 grand final that the then NSW Premier Nathan Rees pledged that if Parramatta were to win the premiership he would rename two of the new trains due to be rolled out across The Sydney network the following year. The names of the new trains were to be "The Hayne Train" and "The Fuifui Moimoi Express". They were to be painted blue and gold, and run along the western line of the railway network.

2010s

On 22 April 2010, the Melbourne Storm were stripped of the premiership as a result of long-term gross salary cap breaches disclosed by the NRL. However, the premiership for 2009 was not handed over to the Parramatta Eels, instead remaining vacant.

In 2010, the Parramatta club were picked at the beginning of the year by many leading betting agencies to take out the premiership for 2010 following their surge of form which took them to the Grand Final in 2009. But, after a relatively poor start to the season, and then a 4-game winning streak, the Parramatta side once again returned to the inconsistent form of past seasons. This inconsistent form, recognised by all Rugby League fans, saw them miss out on the Top 8 in 2010.

After a season of unrelenting disappointment which saw five-eighth Daniel Mortimer dropped to reserve grade, centre Timana Tahu being suspended for an on-field confrontation against the Newcastle Knights and reports of player rifts, Daniel Anderson was sacked unceremoniously as Parramatta coach and replaced by New Zealand World Cup-winning coach Stephen Kearney.

The Parramatta club made several new player signings for the 2011 season. In the forwards, the Eels added former Queensland centre Carl Webb and former Bulldogs and Cronulla as well as one-time Kangaroo Reni Maitua. To bolster the backs after the retirement of Eric Grothe Jr and the departure of Timana Tahu, the Eels signed the experienced pair of Chris Walker and Chris Hicks.

The 2011 season was to be considered a year of "almosts“ for Parramatta, with the team losing over half of their matches by four points or fewer, many of which were conceded after attaining leads over their opponents. Parramatta pushed a record four games into Golden Point during the season, however were unable to win any, resulting in a draw against the St. George Illawarra Dragons and one-point losses to the Penrith Panthers, Sydney Roosters and the Canterbury-Bankstown Bulldogs.

Throughout the 2011 season, coach Stephen Kearney motioned several reshuffles of the Parramatta side, the most high-profile change being fullback Jarryd Hayne's switch to five-eighth after his ball-playing abilities were considered by several experts including the NSW State of Origin coach Ricky Stuart, as his strongest point. Other switches include the moving of Luke Burt to fullback, second-rower Ben Smith to right centre, and the resting of five-eighth Daniel Mortimer.

Before the final match of their season, Parramatta had won only five of their 24 games and were in contention for the dreaded wooden spoon. During their final match, the Parramatta side emerged victorious over the Gold Coast Titans who were also direct contenders for last place. The wooden spoon was awarded to the Gold Coast side, finishing 16th on the NRL ladder, the club finishing in 14th position.

The 2012 season saw the retirement of Parramatta legends Luke Burt and Nathan Hindmarsh. It would also mark the first time since 1972 that the team would succumb to the dreaded wooden spoon. Parramatta struggled all year, securing just their first win of the season in Round 5 against defending premiers Manly-Warringah Sea Eagles before ending a six-game losing streak against the Cronulla-Sutherland Sharks. This horror start to the season, and a win rate of less than 25% over almost two seasons with the club, coach Stephen Kearney was forced to resign and Assistant Coach Brad Arthur would become caretaker. The team responded to this producing 3 wins from 4 games, including competition front-runners Melbourne Storm and Brisbane Broncos to give the fans some hope for the rest of the season. However this was short lived and following a 38-6 thumping to the South Sydney Rabbitohs in Round 25 of the Telstra Premiership were officially unable to avoid the wooden spoon.

Whilst Parramatta's problems in 2012 were largely attributed to their relatively poor defence, numerous pundits blamed them on the recurring absences of star fullback Jarryd Hayne. Even whilst producing higher per-match statistics than any other fullback in the game (8 tries, 14 try-assists), Hayne only managed to complete 10 games from the season's 24, due to both injury and State of Origin duty.

Throughout the season many of the Parramatta players came under scrutiny and were dropped to the NSW Cup, including high-profile recruit Chris Sandow, who at the time was touted as overweight and unfit, and veteran Luke Burt. As a result, players Matt Ryan, Jake Mullaney and Nathan Smith were called up to the top squad and have impressed in their roles of Second-Row, Fullback and Hooker respectively, making a suitable replacement for injured stars Jarryd Hayne and Matt Keating.

Towards the end of the season Ricky Stuart was announced as the new coach for the Parramatta Eels from 2013.

Another wooden spoon followed in 2013, with the club suffering their second biggest loss ever (4-64 to Melbourne in Round 24), and conceding three other scores of 50 or more. On 12 September 2013, it was announced Ricky Stuart would leave Parramatta to take up the head coaching role at Canberra for the 2014 season.

Parramatt determined to continue their rebuilding process in the off season after receiving the wooden spoon two years running. The club did this by releasing 12 players and signing more in key areas to help them achieve success in the 2014 season.

Parramatta also recruited a new coach in Brad Arthur, formerly an Assistant Coach at the club, as Ricky Stuart reneged on the final two years of his contract. This was in order to return to his hometown of Canberra and coach the Raiders, the team he played for during his youth. Before the 2014 season started, Brad Arthur and Parramatta implemented a new recruitment policy and made strong signings including future NSW hooker Nathan Peats, promising star Corey Norman and William Hopoate who was a 2011 premiership winner and NSW representative before leaving rugby league to join a two-year Mormon mission.

The 2014 season started off in great style as Parramatta won 4 out of their first 6 matches. Parramatta then went into their Easter Monday clash at Stadium Australia sitting 5th on the ladder but lost the match controversially 21–18 in front of 50,000 fans. In round 24 Parramatta were sitting 8th on the ladder and looked destined to play in the finals for the first time since 2009 and only needed to win one of their last two remaining games against sides lower than them on the table which were Canberra and Newcastle. Parramatta lost both matches and missed out on the finals series by two competition points.

The 2015 season was a year to forget for Parramatta as they finished 12th on the table. The highlights being in Round 1 when Parramatta defeated Manly 42-12 and Semi Radradra scoring 24 tries in 18 matches.

The discovery by the NRL in 2016 of salary cap breaches, over a period of four years, resulted in it stripping the Parramatta club of the twelve competition points the club has accrued so far in the 2016 NRL season. In addition to being fined $1 million, Parramatta also had its 2016 NRL Auckland Nines title revoked.[35][36]. On 19 July 2016 the Parramatta Leagues Club board was sacked by the Independent Liquor and Gaming Authority, and an administrator appointed. This effectively also removed the Parramatta board as the seven directors on both boards were the same people. Max Donnelly, of Ferrier Hodgson was appointed as administrator.[37]. At the time of the 12-point deduction, Parramatta were sitting 5th on the ladder but then found themselves at 14th position. Their first match played after the points deduction was against South Sydney at Parramatta Stadium, Parramatta lost the match 22–20 in a close game. 2016 would also prove to be the final year that Parramatta would play at Parramatta Stadium as it was due to be demolished at seasons end to make way for a new 30,000-seat stadium. The final home game played at Parramatta Stadium was against The St. George in front of 13,553 spectators. Parramatta went on to beat St. George 30–18. Parramatta's final game of 2016 saw them travel to New Zealand to play The Auckland Warriors. Parramatta won the match 40–18 with Bevan French scoring 3 tries. At the end of the season, Parramatta finished in 14th place on the ladder but had they not been stripped of the 12 competition points they would have played in the finals. The 2016 season was also difficult for Parramatta as to become salary cap compliant the club needed to release players such as Nathan Peats and Junior Paulo to be able to play for points. Star recruit Kieran Foran who signed only months earlier on a $1 million a year contract also walked out on the club mid-season due to numerous personal problems and off field issues.

The 2017 season saw a major turnaround for the club with Parramatta finishing fourth on the table and making the finals for the first time since 2009. Some of the highlights throughout the year were the club winning nine out of their final ten matches and defeating Brisbane twice including a 52–34 win at Suncorp Stadium and eventual premiers Melbourne. Parramatta then went on to play premiership favorites Melbourne in the first qualifying final, going into the second half Parramatta had stunned everyone by leading the match and it took Melbourne the last play of the game to hold on and win 18–16. The following week, Parramatta played against North Queensland in the sudden death elimination final.  Parramatta led 10–6 at halftime but went on to lose the match 24–16 in what would be one of the biggest upsets of the season.

For the 2018 season, Parramatta were predicted by many before the season to finish in the top 8 and challenge for the premiership. Those predictions were matched in the opening round of the season as Parramatta lead Penrith 14-0 early on but after a second half capitulation lost the game 24–14.  In Round 2, Parramatta were humiliated 54-0 by Manly at Brookvale Oval. Parramatta went on to lose the opening 6 games of the season before eventually winning their first game of the season defeating Manly 44–10 in Round 7.  In Round 8, Parramatta defeated Wests 24–22 to make it back to back victories for the club. The Eels then went on to lose the next 5 games in a row before eventually winning their third game of the season defeating North Queensland 20–14 in Darwin in which Jarryd Hayne returned from injury scoring two tries. The following weeks were filled with disappointment as the club came close to pulling off upset wins against top of the table St George only for the club to concede two tries in 5 minutes to lose 20-18 and South Sydney after leading 20-6 late into the game only for The Rabbitohs to score late tries and win 26–20. In Round 18, Parramatta lost 18–16 to Newcastle with The Eels being denied a last minute try after it was ruled winger Bevan French had put his foot over the sideline. The following week, Parramatta defeated arch rivals Canterbury 14–8 in what the media dubbed the "Spoon Bowl". There were hopes that Parramatta could avoid the wooden spoon as going into the second last game of the season the club sat above North Queensland on the table due to for and against. In what was the retiring Jonathan Thurston's final home game, both clubs needed a win to avoid the wooden spoon. North Queensland won the match 44–6. In the final game of the season, Parramatta were defeated 44-10 by the Sydney Roosters ensuring that the club finished last and claimed their 14th wooden spoon and the Roosters claiming the minor premiership. Before the match, the Roosters needed to defeat Parramatta by 27 points to overtake Melbourne and finish first on the table.

Before the start of the 2019 NRL season, Parramatta were predicted by many to finish towards the bottom of the table or claim another wooden spoon.  The club started off the year with back to back victories over Penrith and arch rivals Canterbury-Bankstown.  In Round 6 of the 2019 NRL season, Parramatta played their first game at the new Western Sydney Stadium against the Wests Tigers and ran out 51-6 winners in front of a sold-out crowd.

In Round 9 against Melbourne, Parramatta suffered one of their worst ever defeats losing 64–10 at Suncorp Stadium.  In the aftermath of the defeat, coach Brad Arthur and the players were placed under intense scrutiny but just a week after the loss, Arthur was given a two-year contract extension by the Parramatta board.  The club would then go on to lose against North Queensland and last placed Penrith in the coming weeks.

Between Round 12 and Round 22 of the 2019 season, Parramatta would go on to win 8 of their 10 games.  In Round 22 against the Gold Coast Titans, Parramatta qualified for the 2019 finals series with a 36–12 victory at Cbus Super Stadium.

At the end of the 2019 regular season, Parramatta finished 5th on the table and qualified for the finals.  In the elimination final against Brisbane, Parramatta won the match 58–0 at the new Western Sydney Stadium.  The victory was the biggest finals win in history, eclipsing Newtown's 55–7 win over St George in 1944.  The match was also Parramatta's biggest win over Brisbane and Brisbane's worst ever loss since entering the competition in 1988.
The following week against Melbourne in the elimination semi final, Parramatta were defeated 32–0 at AAMI Park which ended their season.  The loss against Melbourne was also the sixth time Parramatta had been defeated by Melbourne in a finals game since 1999.

2020s
At the start of the 2020 NRL season, Parramatta won their first five matches in a row which put them at the top of the table. It was the club's best start to a season since 1989.
At the end of the 2020 regular season, Parramatta finished in third place on the table and secured a top four spot.  It was the club's highest finish on the table since 2005.
In the qualifying final, Parramatta lead Melbourne 12-0 early on before losing the match 36–24 at Suncorp Stadium.  The following week in the elimination final, Parramatta played against South Sydney for the first time in a finals game since 1965.  Parramatta lead the match 18-8 before a second hald capitulation saw them lose 38-24 ending their season.

Parramatta started the 2021 NRL season with four consecutive victories before losing to St. George Illawarra in round 5.  They then won the next five matches in a row to sit second on the competition ladder after ten rounds.
By round 18, the club sat entrenched within the top four of the competition with a six-point gap ahead of the fifth and sixth placed Sydney Roosters and Manly-Warringah. The club then suffered an end of season slump losing to Canberra, an understrength Sydney Roosters side 28-0 and then two heavy defeats against South Sydney and Manly.  Parramatta recovered to defeat North Queensland and then pulled off one of the upsets in 2021, defeating Melbourne 22-10 which ended their 19-game winning streak.
Parramatta would end the 2021 regular season in sixth place.  In week one against Newcastle in the elimination final, Parramatta won a close match 28–20.  The following week, Parramatta lost 8–6 in the lowest scoring match of the year against Penrith in the second week of the finals which ended their season.

Parramatta started the 2022 NRL season winning four of their opening five matches.  Throughout the 2022 regular season, Parramatta struggled with consistency.  Although they defeated Penrith and Melbourne twice, the club only managed to win more than three games consecutively on two separate occasions and lost to eventual wooden spooners the Wests Tigers in round 6 of the competition.  In round 14, Parramatta suffered an embarrassing 34–4 loss against arch-rivals Canterbury who were sitting bottom of the table.  In round 22, Parramatta were defeated 26-0 by South Sydney which saw them fall to seventh on the table.  However, Parramatta would win their final three games in convincing fashion to finish fourth.  In week one of the finals, Parramatta were defeated 27-8 by Penrith before bouncing back the following week against Canberra in the elimination final 40–4 to reach their first preliminary final since 2009.  In the preliminary final, Parramatta pulled off one of the biggest upsets in the NRL era defeating North Queensland 24–20 in Townsville to reach the Grand Final.  In the 2022 NRL Grand Final against Penrith, Parramatta trailed 18–0 at half-time before going on to lose 28–12.

Club identity

Kit sponsors and manufacturers

Name and emblem
Like most NSWRFL clubs founded before the 1980s, Parramatta was established with no official nickname or mascot. The only nickname Parramatta had ever been known by was the "Fruitpickers", a reference to the orchards spread throughout the District and surrounding suburbs in the first half of the 20th century. As the competition and the clubs themselves became more focused on marketing in the 1970s, Parramatta adopted an official club mascot.

In the mid-1960s, Peter Frilingos, a Sydney rugby league journalist, suggested that the club should be known as the "Eels". This reasoning was based on the name of the Parramatta, anglicised from the Aboriginal dialect "Barramattagal" meaning "place where the Eels dwell". After this, the team was commonly called "The Eels" and it became an official nickname in the late 1970s.

As a result, the club's crest was changed in 1980, to a design featuring an eel. This crest remained, despite several changes in jersey design, until a new eel logo was introduced in 2000. In 2004, the club mascot featured on the crest reverted to an eel drawing similar to that featured on the original crest.

Parramatta has also used two separate crests based on Parramatta City's crest. The first was a highly detailed scene showing a typical scene on the foreshore of the Parramatta River in the early days of European settlement.  It is an apparent tribute to the District's original occupants, the Barramattagal tribe. In the foreground of the original crest, a male Aboriginal is preparing to spear a fish while a woman in a canoe watches. In the background a paddle steamer is visible as well as the tree-lined banks of the Parramatta River. This crest was used by the club until the 1970s when a more stylised version showing only the hunter, and the club's name on a scroll, was used.  This crest is still used in 2006 by the Parramatta District Junior Rugby League Football Club.

In 2009, the Parramatta Eels announced they were returning to their original 1980s club emblem in the 2011 season with the numbers 1947 added, this being the year of conception of the Eels.

Colours
When a Parramatta District Club was first proposed in 1936, the colours put forward to the New South Wales Rugby League by the District were emerald green and white, as these were the colours worn by the Western Districts President's Cup side and the Western Suburbs Rugby Union Club. However, when the proposal for a Parramatta club was next put to the NSWRL in 1946, the proposed colours for the new District side were blue and gold. These colours are said to have been selected based on the navy blue, sky blue and gold colours used by Arthur Phillip High School. These colours were also adopted by the Parramatta District Rugby Union club in 1936 and also suggested in Parramatta City Council's use of livery of blue and golden-orange in their crest. While this colour scheme has remained consistent throughout the history of the club, the shades of blue and gold have changed several times.

The original Parramatta jersey used in 1947 was of a blue design with a single yellow hoop around the middle of the jersey, extending across the sleeves. This original design was altered in 1949 to a design based on blue and gold hoops and remained unchanged until the 1970s when a jersey comprising stripes on a predominantly blue or gold background was adopted. Over the years, the design has changed gradually from one based on blue and gold stripes to a design incorporating different blue and gold designs around the fringes of a predominantly blue or gold jersey.

Primary jerseys

Stadium

Rugby league was played at Cumberland Oval from as early as 1909 by local clubs such as Parramatta Iona, Endeavours and the Western Districts representative side. When the club was admitted into the NSWRL Premiership in 1947, Cumberland Oval became its home ground. The club played its first match in the premiership on 12 April 1947 against Newtown, being defeated 34–12 in front of 6,000 spectators. Cumberland Oval remained the home ground of the Parramatta Eels until 1981; the club played their last match there against the Manly-Warringah Sea Eagles. Later that year, after the Parramatta Eels secured their first-ever Premiership trophy, Eels fans rallied at Cumberland Oval; during the celebrations, fans set fire to the ground's soon-to-be-demolished stand.

From 1982 to 1985, the club used Belmore Oval, home of the Canterbury-Bankstown Bulldogs, as a temporary home ground while a new facility Parramatta Stadium was built. The new stadium to be built on the site of Cumberland Oval was approved by the New South Wales Government for development in 1983 and the contract for the construction and design of the Stadium was put to competitive tender. After construction was completed in November 1985, the club played its first match at the new stadium on 16 March 1986 winning this opening game 36–6 against the St. George Dragons. The original capacity of the ground stood at 30,000, though after re-development of the hills behind each in-goal area into seated terraces in 2002, the capacity was reduced to 21,487.

The largest crowd to watch a rugby league match at Cumberland Oval was 22,470 when the Parramatta took on the South Sydney Rabbitohs on 26 April 1971. The largest crowd at Parramatta Stadium under the current configuration was 21,141 in 2006 against the Wests Tigers. The largest ever attendance for a Parramatta Eels home game came in the stadium's first season when 27,243 saw the Eels draw 12-all with South Sydney in Round 24 of the 1986 NSWRL season. The largest ever rugby league attendance at Parramatta Stadium was set on 6 July 1994 when 27,918 saw Australia defeat France 58–0 in a one-off mid-season Test match. This was also the first test match held in Sydney since 1914 that wasn't played at either the Agricultural Ground, the SCG, or the Sydney Football Stadium.

Parramatta Stadium was closed & demolished in 2017 with CommBank Stadium being built in the same location. This stadium has a 30,000 seat capacity and was opened in 2019.  The first NRL match to be played at the new venue was in Round 6 2019 between Parramatta and Wests Tigers.  Parramatta won the match 51–6 in front of a full house.  While CommBank Stadium was under construction, Parramatta played home games at ANZ Stadium between 2017 and the first few rounds of 2019.
The Eels currently share a Western Sydney Stadium with many NRL clubs such as the Wests Tigers and arch-rivals Canterbury-Bankstown.

Rivalries

Parramatta Eels vs Manly-Warringah Sea Eagles rivalry

Parramatta has a rivalry with Northern Beaches-based club Manly-Warringah Sea Eagles.  Though both clubs were formed in the same year, this rivalry did not develop until the 1970s and 1980s when the clubs faced each other in three Grand Finals: in 1976, 1982 and 1983. The clubs also competed in several play-off finals matches during this period including a controversial drawn semi-final and subsequent replay in 1978. The famous rivalry between the clubs was also marked in an advertising jingle in a 1970s Tooheys television commercial. The rivalry has been regularly rekindled at various times since, particularly when Parramatta players have transferred to play with Manly. Since their 2005 finals series clash, Parramatta and Manly have not played each other in a finals game since and have not played against each other in a Grand Final since 1983.

On 18 May 2003, Parramatta and Manly played in the first ever golden point match in NRL history.  Manly would win the match 36-34 at Brookvale Oval courtesy of a Ben Walker penalty goal.
In round 2 of the 2018 NRL season, Parramatta suffered their worst ever loss to Manly.  The game was played in temperatures of nearly 40 degrees where Manly ran out 54-0 winners.
In the 2019 NRL season, Parramatta beat Manly in round 25 to take Manly's 5th spot on the ladder and  would go on to beat Brisbane 58–0 in the elimination final.  The victory is currently the biggest win in finals history.
In round 11 of the 2022 NRL season, Manly lead Parramatta by ten points in the second half before Parramatta scored two tries to make it 20-20. Parramatta player Mitchell Moses then converted a goal from the side line to win the match 22-20.
In round 21 of the 2022 NRL season, the two sides met at Brookvale Oval where Manly needed to defeat Parramatta if they were to stand any chance of reaching the finals.  Parramatta would win the game 36-20 with the maligned Jakob Arthur providing two try assists for Parramatta which ended Manly's finals hopes.

Since the 2000s, the rivalry has seen numerous player swaps or players who have featured for both clubs which in the early days was a rare occurrence of the fixture. Such players who have been at both clubs since 2000 include Jamie Lyon, Daniel Heckenberg, Shayne Dunley, Kylie Leuluai, Michael Witt, Aaron Cannings, Jack Afamasaga, Feleti Mateo, Richard Faʻaoso, Blake Green, Joe Galuvao, Tony Williams, Jeff Robson, Jonathan Wright, Justin Horo, Chris Hicks, Cheyse Blair, Darcy Lussick, Kelepi Tanginoa, Brayden Wiliame, Daniel Harrison, William Hopoate, David Gower, Anthony Watmough, Clinton Gutherson, Kieran Foran, Siosaia Vave, Shaun Lane, Andrew Davey, Joey Lussick and Michael Oldfield.

Parramatta Eels vs Canterbury-Bankstown Bulldogs rivalry
The most significant rivalry is with the Canterbury-Bankstown Bulldogs and began in the early days between the two sides.  The rivalry grew further during the 1980s when the clubs faced one another in Grand Finals in 1984 and 1986 as well as regular play-off matches during this period.

This rivalry received renewed impetus during the Super League war when Parramatta recruited four notable Canterbury players.

In 1998, Parramatta and Canterbury played against each other in the preliminary final with the winners to play the Brisbane Broncos in the grand final.  Parramatta were leading the match 18–2 with under 10 minutes to play until what happened next can only be described as one of the greatest capitulations in finals history.  Canterbury scored three tries in ten minutes and took the game to extra time winning the game 32–20. Parramatta would need to wait 9 years to exact their revenge on Canterbury when they played in the 2007 elimination final and won the match 25–6.  In the 2008 NRL season, Parramatta and Canterbury met in round 24 with Canterbury needing to defeat Parramatta in order to avoid the Wooden Spoon.  Parramatta would go on to defeat Canterbury-Bankstown 26-12 and condemn them to their fifth spoon.

In 2009 on their fairy tale run to the grand final, Parramatta faced off against Canterbury in the preliminary final in front of a record crowd of 74,549. Billed as the "Sydney Grand Final", Parramatta were down 12–6 at halftime but came back in the second half to win 22–12. Proving why their rivalry is one of the leagues most bitter.

Speaking to the Herald Sun in 2007, former Canterbury-Bankstown player Craig Polla-Mounter described the rivalry between the two club's saying "I think the Parramatta and Canterbury fans can be the most unforgiving, especially when we play each other. I have no doubt it is the biggest rivalry in rugby league and part of the reason he didn't play again".  Polla-Mounter said this in reference to Parramatta player Paul Carige and his infamous performance in the 1998 preliminary final.

Parramatta Eels vs Penrith Panthers rivalry

Another rivalry is with neighboring Western Sydney club the Penrith Panthers. The match between the two is known as the "Western Sydney derby" or "The Battle of the West". Aside from local 'bragging rights' the rivalry is also partly founded in bitterness associated with the former status of the Penrith district as part of the Parramatta rugby league district. The relationship between local Penrith clubs and the Parramatta District was often problematic; players and officials in the Penrith area considered themselves ignored and neglected by the Parramatta club during the 1950s and 1960s. Parramatta beat Penrith in two finals games in 1985 winning 38-6 and in 2000 when Parramatta won again 28–10. In 2021, Penrith beat Parramatta in a tight and bruising affair 8–6 on their way to winning the 2021 Grand Final.

In round 9 of the 2022 NRL season, Parramatta defeated Penrith 22–20 at Penrith Stadium. This ended Penrith's eight match winning streak to start the season and it was also the first time Penrith had lost at the ground since the 2019 NRL season.
In round 20 of the same season, Parramatta defeated Penrith 34–10.  Parramatta were the only team in the 2022 NRL season to beat Penrith twice.  In the 2022 finals series, Penrith defeated Parramatta 27–8 in the qualifying final.  The two clubs would then meet in the 2022 NRL Grand Final with Penrith securing back to back premierships defeating Parramatta 28–12.  Following the grand final, some of the Penrith players mocked the Parramatta club in public and on social media with James Fisher-Harris saying that Parramatta were now Penrith's sons followed by the player inviting Penrith supporters to chant "We hate Parra" and Jarome Luai posting on social media "Daddy loves you" which was in reference to Luai saying before the grand final that Penrith were now Parramatta's "Daddy".

Parramatta Eels vs St. George Illawarra Dragons rivalry

The Eels did have a rivalry with another Sydney-based team, the St. George Illawarra Dragons. The Eels were the Dragons' first-ever opponents as a joint-venture and the match was also the second ever held at Stadium Australia which would be the venue for the Olympic Games the following year. The Eels won 20-10 but the Dragons later moved on to make the Grand Final. The rivalry was not based on geographic location or tribalism as it was more based on both teams being in the finals hunt and pursuit of the premiership. In recent years there were some memorable, not to mention controversial matches, including:
Round 18, 2005: Dragons captain Trent Barrett and Eels hooker PJ Marsh instigated an all-in brawl as Barrett kicked down-field and Marsh attempted to smother his kick. Barrett took exception to the tackle and punched Marsh in the back of the head whilst Eels fullback Wade McKinnon fielded the kick and ran 80 metres to score. It turned out to be the turning point to the match as the Eels would go on to win 40–14.
Round 13, 2006: After 70 minutes without a score, Parramatta kicked a field goal to go 1-0 up before 8 unanswered points by the Dragons got them home 8–1 in one of the weirdest matches ever in NRL history. This match was played in driving rain at WIN Jubilee Oval, Kogarah.
Round 26, 2009: With the minor premiership seemingly all but lost, the Dragons thrashed the Eels 37–0 to actually finish on top of the NRL ladder from the Bulldogs who had lost 34–18 against the Wests Tigers in the second match played on the same night as the Dragons vs Eels match. The win by the Dragons ended Parramatta's late season surge and it saw the Eels finish eighth.
4th Qualifying Final, 2009: But in the qualifying final nine days later, the Eels turned the tables on the Dragons and beat the premiership favourites 25–12, a 50-point turnaround. The Eels would then go on to make the Grand Final (which they ultimately lost to the disgraced Melbourne Storm) whilst the Dragons would exit the finals altogether after losing to the Brisbane Broncos 24–10.
Round 13, 2011: After being thrashed 30–0 against the Dragons in a previous round the Eels began the match as underdogs. The Eels got out to a 14–0 lead only for it to be chased down by the Dragons. After 10 minutes of extra time and neither side being able to break the dead-lock, the game was declared a draw. However, Eels fullback Jarryd Hayne almost pulled off a miracle field goal from close to 60 metres out only for the kick to fade late and miss by half a metre.

Parramatta Eels vs Melbourne Storm rivalry

Parramatta have also developed a rivalry with the Melbourne Storm. After Melbourne were found to have breached the salary cap from 2006 to 2010, Parramatta felt robbed of a premiership, having gone down to Melbourne in the 2009 NRL Grand Final and wanted a chance at redemption. In 2010, Parramatta got this chance.
Round 13, 2010: After Melbourne were found to have breached the salary cap over the previous five years and robbed several teams of premiership glory including the Parramatta Eels, the Eels got their chance at redemption. In front of a loud and proud home crowd who let Melbourne know what they'd done, Parramatta beat Melbourne, who still had their illegal roster but could no longer accrue points, 24–10. The game was marred by two fights which erupted. The first started after Eels fullback Jarryd Hayne and Melbourne fullback Billy Slater came head to head after Hayne had worked Slater over in a tackle.

Hayne proceeded to head-butt Slater who responded with a punch and the 2 had to be separated. The second occurred again after Hayne and Slater came together. This time Slater was the aggressor and appeared to lead with an elbow when tackling Hayne. Parramatta Five-Eighth Daniel Mortimer was then put in the Sin-Bin for being the third man in. Parramatta  fired-up after this incident with prop Fui Fui Moi Moi charging onto the ball from the ensuing penalty and gaining 20 metres. Parramatta kept their heads and won the game by a comfortable margin in the end.

As of 3 October 2020, Parramatta has never defeated Melbourne in a finals game having lost all seven encounters in the 1999 preliminary final, 2006 qualifying final, 2007 preliminary final, The 2009 NRL Grand Final, 2017 qualifying final, the 2019 elimination semi final and 2020 qualifying final.
Parramatta hold the record as the side who have scored the most points against Melbourne in a single match when they defeated them 54-10 during the 2001 NRL season.
In round 24 of the 2021 NRL season, Parramatta defeated Melbourne 22-10 which ended their record equalling 19-game winning streak.  Melbourne were only one win from setting an all-time winning streak of 20 victories in a row. Parramatta were the only team to defeat Minor Premiers, Melbourne twice during the 2021 NRL regular season.
In round 25 of the 2022 NRL season, Parramatta defeated Melbourne 22–14 to leapfrog them into fourth place on the table.  The result meant that Melbourne finished in fifth place, their lowest finish since the 2014 NRL season.

Players

Current squad

The current playing squad and coaching staff of the Parramatta Eels for the 2023 NRL season.

Notable players
In 2002 a team of the greatest Parramatta players, known as the Parramatta Legends, were selected based on a public vote of fans. In August of that year the following players were named in each position:

Representative players

Coaches

The first grade Parramatta Eels team has been coached by 29 different coaches since foundation.

Supporters
At the end of the 2021 NRL season, Parramatta had the most NRL membership numbers out of all the 16 clubs in the competition with just under 33,000 paying members.

Some of the club's notable supporters include :
 Sean Abbott, Australian cricketer
 John Afoa, New Zealand rugby union footballer
 Simon Baker, Australian actor
 Katherine Bates, Australian track and road cyclist  
 Bruce Beresford, Australian film director
 Toni Collette, Australian actress
 Shaun Diviney, Australian musician
 Joel Edgerton, Australian actor
 Jon English, English-Australian musician and actor
 Danny Green, professional Australian boxer
 Nicholas Hamilton, Australian actor
 Paul Hogan, Australian actor and comedian
 Darren Lehmann, Former Australian cricketer
 Aaron Mooy, Australian soccer player
 Melanie McLaughlin, Australian sport presenter
 Sam Naismith, AFL footballer
 Tex Perkins, Australian musician
 Simon Pryce, Australian performer in The Wiggles
 Nathan Rees, 41st Premier of New South Wales
 Mathew Ryan, Australian soccer player
 Gurinder Sandhu, Australian cricketer
 Dani Samuels, Australian Olympian
 Jordan Silk, Australian cricketer
 Daryl Somers, Australian television presenter

Statistics and records

Individual records
Most appearances (200+)
 Nathan Hindmarsh (330) from 1998 to 2012
 Brett Kenny (265) from 1980 to 1993
 Luke Burt (264) from 1999 to 2012
 Nathan Cayless (259) from 1997 to 2010
 Ray Price (258) from 1976 to 1986
 Tim Mannah (233) from 2009 to 2019
 Peter Sterling (227) from 1978 to 1992
 Bob O'Reilly (216) from 1967 to 1982
 Mick Cronin (216) from 1977 to 1986
 Mark Laurie (205) from 1982 to 1992
 Daniel Wagon (204) from 1999 to 2008
 Fuifui Moimoi (201) from 2004 to 2014

Scoring records

Mick Cronin holds the record for most points scored across all grades (2,001) between 1977 and 1986.  Cronin also holds the record for most points scored in a single season (282) in 1978. Luke Burt holds the record for most First Grade tries (111) between 1999 and 2012.

Parramatta's largest victory was a 74 - 4 win over Cronulla-Sutherland Sharks on 23 August 2003 at Parramatta Stadium.  The club's largest defeat was a 0 - 68 loss to Canberra Raiders on 22 August 1993 at Canberra Stadium.

Attendances

The largest crowd Parramatta has played before was 104,583 at Telstra Stadium in the Round 1 'doubleheader' in 1999. The largest home crowd at Parramatta Stadium, before the construction of the hill terraces, was 27,243 against South Sydney Rabbitohs on 17 August 1986.
The record crowd Parramatta has played in front of at the new Western Sydney Stadium is 29,372.  In this match, Parramatta defeated Brisbane 58–0 in week one of the 2019 finals series.  It is the biggest winning margin in a finals match since the competition began in 1908.

Head-to-head records

All time match record
The all time playing record for the Parramatta team since 1947 (including finals).

Finals Appearances
31 (1962, 1963, 1964, 1965, 1971, 1975, 1976, 1977, 1978, 1979, 1981, 1982, 1983, 1984, 1985, 1986, 1997, 1998, 1999, 2000, 2001, 2002, 2005, 2006, 2007, 2009, 2017, 2019, 2020, 2021, 2022)

Honours

First-grade
New South Wales Rugby League, Australian Rugby League and National Rugby League Premierships: 4
 1981, 1982, 1983, 1986
Premiership runners-up: 5
 1976, 1977, 1984, 2001, 2009*, 2022
New South Wales Rugby League, Australian Rugby League and National Rugby League Minor Premierships: 5
 1977, 1982, 1986, 2001, 2005
Mid-week cup: 2
 1980, 1986
Rugby League World Sevens: 2
 1997, 2003
NRL Nines: 1
 2016*

Youth and pre-season 
First Division, Premier League: 9
 1975, 1977, 1979, 1997, 1999, 2005, 2006, 2007, 2008 (as Wentworthville Magpies)
New South Wales Rugby League Club Championships: 17
 1976, 1977, 1978, 1979, 1980, 1981, 1982, 1986, 1997, 1998, 1999, 2000, 2001, 2002, 2003, 2005, 2008
Pre-Season Cup Titles: 1
 1975
Jersey Flegg Cup: 3
 1970, 1985, 1990
SG Ball Cup: 12
 1966, 1967, 1968, 1973, 1983, 1987, 1988, 1991, 1993, 1999, 2007, 2017
Harold Matthews Cup: 20
 1970, 1971, 1972, 1975, 1976, 1981, 1982, 1986, 1988, 1990, 1994, 1997, 1998, 1999, 2003, 2004, 2008, 2012, 2013, 2016
Mills Cup: 2
 2007, 2008
Bandaged Bear Cup: 4
 2007, 2008, 2009, 2010
Jack Gibson Cup: 3
 2008, 2012, 2014

Women's team

Current squad
The current playing squad and coaching staff of the Parramatta Eels for the 2021 NRL Women's season as of 27 February 2022.

References

External links

 Official Parramatta Eels website
 National Rugby League website
 New South Wales Rugby League website

 
National Rugby League clubs
Rugby league teams in Sydney
Rugby clubs established in 1947
1947 establishments in Australia
Sport in Parramatta
Fan-owned football clubs